The Second cabinet of Geir Haarde in Iceland was formed 24 May 2007. It resigned due to the 2009 Icelandic financial crisis protests.

Cabinet

Inaugural cabinet: 24 May 2007 – 1 February 2009
The Ministry of Commerce was renamed in English the Ministry of Business Affairs but the Icelandic name was unchanged. The Ministry of Industry was renamed in English the Ministry of Industry, Energy and Tourism but the Icelandic name was unchanged.

Change: 1 January 2008
The Ministry of Agriculture and the Ministry of Fisheries merged to form the Ministry of Fisheries and Agriculture (Sjávarútvegs- og landbúnaðarráðuneytið). The Ministry of Health and Social Security was renamed the Ministry of Health (Heilbrigðisráðuneytið). The Ministry of Social Affairs was renamed the Ministry of Social Affairs and Social Security (Félags- og tryggingamálaráðuneytið). Statistics Iceland became an independent government agency.

See also
Government of Iceland
Cabinet of Iceland

References

Geir Haarde, Second cabinet of
Geir Haarde, Second cabinet of
Geir Haarde, Second cabinet of
Cabinets established in 2007
Cabinets disestablished in 2009
Independence Party (Iceland)
Social Democratic Alliance